Anopina xicotepeca is a species of moth of the family Tortricidae. It is found in Puebla, Mexico.

The length of the forewings is 7 mm. The ground colour of the forewings is whitish grey with grey suffusions and strigulations (fine streaks). The markings are dark grey with black spots. The hindwings are whitish with greyish strigulations.

Etymology
The species name refers to the type locality of Xicotepec de Juarez, Mexico.

References

Moths described in 2004
xicotepeca
Moths of Central America
Taxa named by Józef Razowski